Walfrid, or Galfrido della Gherardesca, was an eighth-century saint from Pisa, Italy.

Life and death 
Though he had six children with his long-time wife, Thesia, they conducted a dutifully religious lifestyle. He co-founded the Abbey of Palazzuolo on Monte Verde; his wife and one of his daughters took the veil in a convent built nearby. His favorite son, Gimfrid, caused Walfrid a great deal of trouble when he ran away from the monastery. Caught and permanently injured in his right hand, a penitent Gimfrid was returned to the monastery, which he presided over after Walfrid's death.

Walfrid died in 765 AD and was sainted in 1861. His feast day is February 15.

References

Italian saints